Robert Griffin may refer to:

Robert Griffin (actor) (1902–1960), American film and television actor
Robert Griffin (baseball) (fl. 1931), American baseball player
Robert Griffin (offensive lineman) (born 1989), American football offensive lineman
Robert Griffin III (born 1990), American football quarterback
Robert F. Griffin (1925–1999), American Roman Catholic priest
Robert G. Griffin (born 1942), professor of chemistry
Robert J. Griffin (born 1950), American-Israeli professional basketball player and professor of English Literature
Robert P. Griffin (1923–2015), United States Senator
Robert U. Griffin, jazz trombonist

See also
Rob Griffin (disambiguation)
Bob Griffin (disambiguation)